The Carrington Event was the most intense geomagnetic storm in recorded history, peaking from 1 to 2 September 1859 during solar cycle 10. It created strong auroral displays that were reported globally and caused sparking and even fires in multiple telegraph stations. The geomagnetic storm was most likely the result of a coronal mass ejection (CME) from the Sun colliding with Earth's magnetosphere.

The geomagnetic storm was associated with a very bright solar flare on 1 September 1859. It was observed and recorded independently by British astronomers Richard Christopher Carrington and Richard Hodgson—the first records of a solar flare.

A geomagnetic storm of this magnitude occurring today would cause widespread electrical disruptions, blackouts, and damage due to extended outages of the electrical power grid.

History
The Carrington Event took place a few months before the solar maximum, a period of elevated solar activity, of solar cycle 10.

Geomagnetic storm

On 1–2 September 1859, one of the largest geomagnetic storms (as recorded by ground-based magnetometers) occurred. Estimates of the storm strength (Dst) range from −0.80 to −1.75 µT.

The geomagnetic storm is thought to have been initiated by a major CME that traveled directly toward Earth, taking 17.6 hours to make the  journey. Typical CMEs take several days to arrive at Earth, but it is believed that the relatively high speed of this CME was made possible by a prior CME, perhaps the cause of the large aurora event on 29 August that "cleared the way" of ambient solar wind plasma for the Carrington Event.

Associated solar flare
Just before noon on 1 September, the English amateur astronomers Richard Christopher Carrington and Richard Hodgson independently recorded the earliest observations of a solar flare. Carrington and Hodgson compiled independent reports which were published side by side in Monthly Notices of the Royal Astronomical Society and exhibited their drawings of the event at the November 1859 meeting of the Royal Astronomical Society.

Because of a geomagnetic solar flare effect (a "magnetic crochet") observed in the Kew Observatory magnetometer record by Scottish physicist Balfour Stewart, and a geomagnetic storm observed the following day, Carrington suspected a solar-terrestrial connection. Worldwide reports of the effects of the geomagnetic storm of 1859 were compiled and published by American mathematician Elias Loomis, which support the observations of Carrington and Stewart.

Impact

Auroras

Auroras were seen around the world, those in the northern hemisphere as far south as the Caribbean. The aurora over the Rocky Mountains in the United States was so bright that the glow woke gold miners, who began preparing breakfast because they thought it was morning. People in the Northeastern United States could read a newspaper by the aurora's light. The aurora was visible from the poles to low latitude areas such as south-central Mexico, Queensland, Cuba, Hawaii, southern Japan and China, and even at lower latitudes very close to the equator, such as in Colombia.

On Saturday 3 September 1859, the Baltimore American and Commercial Advertiser reported:

In 1909, an Australian gold miner named C F Herbert retold his observations in a letter to the Daily News in Perth:

Telegraphs
Because of the geomagnetically induced current from the electromagnetic field, telegraph systems all over Europe and North America failed, in some cases giving their operators electric shocks. Telegraph pylons threw sparks. Some operators were able to continue to send and receive messages despite having disconnected their power supplies. The following conversation occurred between two operators of the American telegraph line between Boston, Massachusetts, and Portland, Maine, on the night of 2 September 1859 and reported in the Boston Evening Traveler:Boston operator (to Portland operator): "Please cut off your battery [power source] entirely for fifteen minutes."

Portland operator: "Will do so. It is now disconnected."

Boston: "Mine is disconnected, and we are working with the auroral current. How do you receive my writing?"

Portland: "Better than with our batteries on. – Current comes and goes gradually."

Boston: "My current is very strong at times, and we can work better without the batteries, as the aurora seems to neutralize and augment our batteries alternately, making current too strong at times for our relay magnets. Suppose we work without batteries while we are affected by this trouble."

Portland: "Very well. Shall I go ahead with business?"

Boston: "Yes. Go ahead."The conversation was carried on for around two hours using no battery power at all and working solely with the current induced by the aurora, the first time on record that more than a word or two was transmitted in such manner.

Similar events

Overall, less severe storms occurred in 1921 (this was comparable by some measures) and 1960, when widespread radio disruption was reported. The March 1989 geomagnetic storm knocked out power across large sections of Quebec. On 23 July 2012, a "Carrington-class" solar superstorm (solar flare, CME, solar electromagnetic pulse) was observed, but its trajectory narrowly missed Earth.

In June 2013, a joint venture from researchers at Lloyd's of London and Atmospheric and Environmental Research (AER) in the US used data from the Carrington Event to estimate the cost of a similar event in the present to the US alone at US$600 billion to $2.6 trillion (equivalent to $ to $ in ), which, at the time, equated to roughly 3.6 to 15.5 per cent of annual GDP.

Other research has looked for signatures of large solar flares and CMEs in carbon-14 in tree rings and beryllium-10 (among other isotopes) in ice cores. The signature of a large solar storm has been found for 774–775 CE and for 993–994 CE. Carbon-14 levels stored in 775 suggest an event about 20 times the normal variation of the sun's activity, and 10 or more times the size of the Carrington Event. An event in 7176 BCE may have exceeded even the 774–775 CE event based on this proxy data. 

Whether the physics of solar flares is similar to that of even larger superflares is still unclear. The sun may differ in important ways such as size and speed of rotation from the types of stars that are known to produce superflares.

Other evidence
Ice cores containing thin nitrate-rich layers have been analysed to reconstruct a history of past solar storms predating reliable observations. This was based on the hypothesis that solar energetic particles would ionize nitrogen, leading to the production of nitric oxide and other oxidised nitrogen compounds, which would not be too diluted in the atmosphere before being deposited along with snow. 

Beginning in 1986, some researchers claimed that data from Greenland ice cores showed evidence of individual solar particle events, including the Carrington Event. More recent ice core work, however, casts significant doubt on this interpretation, and shows that nitrate spikes are likely not a result of solar energetic particle events but can be due to terrestrial events such as forest fires, and correlate with other chemical signatures of known forest fire plumes. Nitrate events in cores from Greenland and Antarctica do not align, so the hypothesis that they reflect proton events is now in significant doubt.

See also
 A-index
 COBRA, 2020 British TV series imagining an equivalent storm affecting modern Britain
 K-index
 Nuclear electromagnetic pulse
 774–775 carbon-14 spike

References

Further reading

 
 
 
 
 
 
 

 

 

 

 

 

 

 

 

 

 

 

 

 

 

 

 

 

 

 

 

 

 

 
  – Excerpts of articles from newspapers concerning the Carrington Event

External links
 
 

1859 in science
1859 natural disasters
Geomagnetic storms
September 1859 events